is a male Japanese voice actor. He is part of 81 Produce, previously Mausu Promotion.

Voice roles

TV animation
Boruto: Naruto Next Generations (Tenma Funato)
Buso Renkin (Shinyo Suzuki)
D.Grayman (Johnny Gill)
Fortune Arterial (Seichiro Togi)
Gakuen Heaven (Omi Shichijo)
Hakuouki: Shinsengumi Kitan (Nagakura Shinpachi)
Katanagatari (Maniwa Kuizame)
Kochoki: Wakaki Nobunaga (Nobuhiro Oda)
Naruto (Izumo Kamizuki)
Naruto Shippuden (Izumo Kamizuki, Amai)
Onmyou Taisenki (Teru Sarigoru)
Rin-ne (Suzuki)
Starship Operators (Shinto Mikami)
Tears to Tiara (Taliesin)
Tokyo Majin (Morihito Inugami)
Trouble Chocolate (Ghana)
X-Men: Evolution
Zegapain (Shima)

OVA
Saint Seiya: The Lost Canvas (Hypnos)

Drama CDGaki no Ryoubun series 4: Uwasa no Shinzui (Ryousuke Asao)Gaki no Ryoubun series 5: Akuun no Jouken (Ryousuke Asao)Recipe (Tatsumi Kaiya)Yume no You na Hanashi (Kan)

Video games
Full House Kiss (Kou Matsukawa)
Hakuoki Shinsengumi Kitan (Nagakura Shinpachi)
Hakuoki Zuisouroku (Nagakura Shinpachi)
Hakuoki Shinsengumi Kitan (PSP) (Nagakura Shinpachi)
Hakuoki Shinsengumi Kitan (PS3) (Nagakura Shinpachi)
Hakuoki Yugiroku (Nagakura Shinpachi)
Princess Maker
Sengoku Basara 2 (Maeda Toshiie)
Tears to Tiara: Kakan no Daichi - Taliesin
Tenchu 2 (Rikimaru)
Tokyo Majin Gakuen Kenpuchō: Tō
 Solatorobo: Red the Hunter (Baion)
Way of the Warrior (Ninja) (Japanese dub)

Tokusatsu
Ninpuu Sentai Hurricaneger (2002): (Poison Flower Ninja Hanasakkadoushi (ep. 5))
K-tai Investigator 7 (2008): (Phone Braver 01 (eps. 2 - 45))
Kamen Rider Decade (2009): (Swallowtail Fangire (ep. 4))
Kamen Rider OOO (2011): (Oumu Yummy (Blue, Red) (ep. 25 - 26 (Blue), 27 (Red)))
Tokumei Sentai Go-Busters (2012): (Sunadokeiloid (ep. 33))

Dubbing

Live-action24 (Lesa Murali)Bottoms Up (Hayden Field (Brian Hallisay))ER (Morales)King Kong (Preston (Colin Hanks))The Hunting Party (Benjamin Strauss (Jesse Eisenberg))NCIS: Los Angeles (Marty Deeks (Eric Christian Olsen))Velvet Goldmine (Arthur Stuart (Christian Bale))

AnimatedThomas the Tank Engine & Friends'' (Toby (succeeding Yasuhiko Kawazu), Sidney (replacing Ken Sanders), Mike, Flynn and Merrick)

References

External links 
 
81 Produce

1971 births
Japanese male voice actors
Male voice actors from Saitama Prefecture
Living people
81 Produce voice actors
Mausu Promotion voice actors